Red at the Bone is an coming of age novel written by Jacqueline Woodson and originally published by Riverhead Books in 2019.

About the book
The story has some interesting elements as noted by reviewers. According to Joshunda Sanders of Time magazine, "Woodson evokes black formalism, a post-Reconstruction movement meant to highlight black dignity through dress, style and traditions performed beyond the white gaze..." And, Woodson employs a minimalist writing style, believing fewer words with emotional impact best serves the story. This style results in a short novel of about 200 pages. NPR says this book also "reads like poetry and drama..." The story itself revolves around five characters of two families spanning three generations. Also, Woodson employs shifting points of view and "the narrative nimbly jumps around in time." And the book explores class, religion, race,  generational wealth, and sexuality. NPR says, "this book [also] manages to encompass issues of...education, ambition, racial prejudice, sexual desire and orientation, identity, mother-daughter relationships, parenthood and loss...." Lastly, reviewers provide praise for the author's previous works and awards in the first part of their reviews.

Summary
One of the anchors of this story is the mother, Iris, who abandons her child. Such a troubling character is to be automatically disparaged in most cultures around the world, including America. The emotional pain inflicted on the child is presumed to be incalculable. However, Woodson gives the reader the possibility that “the wound of maternal abandonment could [perhaps] be alleviated [and] healed by other kinds of love.” 

Iris becomes pregnant in high school at the age of 15 by a boy named Aubrey, who is also still in high school. Yet, after the baby is born, Aubrey falls in love with his new born daughter named Melody and "being a parent." He moves into Iris's parents' house to start their new family life. In contrast, Iris cannot quench her desire for more than her parent's house and more than Aubrey. She leaves the house, Aubrey, and her daughter for college. College was her plan before getting pregnant. She has no interest in Aubrey as father and mate.

Yet, years later Iris tells her daughter Melody, “I wanted you. I wanted you growing in my body, I wanted you in my arms, I wanted you over my shoulder,”  Hence, Iris went against her family's and others' passionate disapproval to give birth to Melody. But it turns out that "Melody spends her formative years with her father Aubrey and her maternal grandmother Sabe while her mother Iris heads off to college as planned."

Reception
This book has received positive reviews. Heller McAlpin of NPR says, "Woodson's language is beautiful throughout Red at the Bone, but it positively soars in the sections written from Iris' mother's point of view." Nic Stone of The Washington Post says, ""Red at the Bone" is a narrative steeped in truth - and, yes, it's painful. But it's also one of healing and hope." Joshunda Sanders of Time magazine says, "Running through the novel is the realization that all stages of life have disruptions that will ripple on the surface and also below...." And The New York Times says, "With its abiding interest in the miracle of everyday love, “Red at the Bone” is a proclamation" Margaret Wilkerson Sexton of the San Francisco Chronicle says this book's "...vast emotional depth, rich historical understanding and revelatory pacing lure the reader into the tender makeup of one family’s origin and promise.

References

External links 
 
Red at the Bone Discussion Guide by Jacqueline Woodson. 
Jacqueline Woodson presentation and discussion. Video. Politics and Prose bookstore. YouTube.
Author's website. "Red at the Bone."

2019 American novels
African-American novels
Novels about race and ethnicity
Novels set in the 21st century
Novels set in the United States
Novels about racism
Bildungsromans
Historical fiction
Riverhead Books books
English-language books